Ismat Chughtai is an Indian Urdu-language writer. Best known for such short-stories as Lihaaf (1942) and Chu Mui (1952), she also wrote other works including novels and non-fictional essays. Chughtai's unfinished autobiography Kaghazi Hai Pairahan was published posthumously.

Short stories
 Dheet, a soliloquy 
 Kafir, her first short story
 Gainda
 Khidmatgaar 
 Lihaaf, 1942

Short story collections
 Kaliyan, 1941
 Choten, 1942
 Ek Baat, 1945
 Chhui Mui, 1952
 Do Haath, 1955 
 Badan ki Khushboo, 1979
 Amarbel, 1979
 Thori si Paagal, 1979
 Aadhi Aurat Aadha Khwaab, 1986

Novels
 Ziddi, 1941
 Tehri Lakeer, 1943
 Saudai, 1964
 Ajeeb Aadmi, 1970
 Ek Qatra Khoon, 1975

Novellas
 Masooma, 1961
 Dil ki Duniya, 1966
 Jungli Kabootar, 1970

Children novellas
 Teen Anarhi, 1988
 Naqli Rajkuman, 1992

Plays
 Fasadi, 1938 
 Shaitan 
 Intikhab, 1939
 Dhani Bankein, 1955 (A collection of six radio dramas)
 Dozakh, 1960
 Tanhai ka Zehr, 1977

Non-fiction
 Bachpan, an essay first published in Saqi 
 Hum Log, a collection of essays 
 Fasadat aur Adab 
 Chirag Jal Rahe hain, a personal narrative about Krishan Chander
 Dozakhi, an essay about her brother Azeem Baig Chughtai
 Mera Dost Mera Dushman, a piece about Manto
 Kaghazi hai Pairahan, 1988 (Unfinished autobiography)

Miscellaneous and collections
 Yahan Se Wahan Tak, Society Publishers, 1981 - autobiography
 A Chughtai Collection, Sama Publishing, 2005. .
 The Heart Breaks Free/The Wild One, South Asia Books, 1993.
 Terhi Lakhir (The Crooked Line), New Delhi, Kali for Women, 1995.
 Quilt and Other Stories, New Delhi, Kali for Women, 1996
 Ismat Chughtai: Shaksiyat aur Fan by Jagdish Chander Wadhawan, 1996, Delhi.
 Lifting the Veil, Penguin, 2001.
 My Friend My Enemy: Essays, Reminiscences, Portraits, New Delhi, Kali for Women, 2001.
 Kaghji Hai Pairahan (Memoir),  Rajkamal Prakashan, 2004. .
 
 Muthakhib Afsanay (Selected Stories), Audible, 2015.

References

Chughtai
Chughtai